Henry Roy Dean, MD, LL.D, D.Sc, FRCP (19 February 1879 – 13 February 1961), also known as Prof. H. R. Dean, was a professor of Pathology at the University of Cambridge and Master of Trinity Hall, Cambridge.

Biography
Henry Roy Dean was born in Bournemouth, Hampshire (now Dorset), England to Joshua Dean and Elizabeth Dean, née MacCormac. Elizabeth Dean was a member of a distinguished Northern Irish medical family and she was the daughter of Henry MacCormac and the sister of Sir William MacCormac. Dean was educated at Sherborne School and he attended with first-class honours the School of Natural Science at New College, Oxford, to be graduated MB BCh in 1904, after medical training at St Thomas' Hospital, where he was medical registrar and after resident assistant physician. After a senior demyship at Magdalen College, Oxford, he took MRCP in 1906, a Radcliffe Travelling Fellowship in 1909 (to study at Wassermann Laboratory, Berlin), D.M. in 1912 and FRCP in 1913.

From 1910 he was assistant bacteriologist at the Lister Institute, London before to become in 1912 Professor of Pathology and Bacteriology at the University of Sheffield. Then he was Professor of Pathology first in the University of Manchester from 1915, where he was also a Major (R.A.M.C.) during the war, then in the University of Cambridge in August 1922, where he was also deputy professor of physic substituting Prof. John Ryle during the second world war.

In Cambridge, in the then small Department of Pathology in Downing Street, early Dean was able to let include in 1925 Pathology as a subject for Part II of the Natural Science Tripos. That was a successful choice, even for the history of pathology: many students who had taken the Part II Pathology course would go on to occupy important positions in pathology and other branches of medicine (among them was Max Barrett). Dean was engaged to design a new building of the Department of Pathology in Tennis Court Road, where it is today from September 1928. In 1946 he improved his course (58 lectures) with a training scheme for the would-be pathologists (2 or 3 years of experience of laboratory work). Apart his own works, he guided others to their subsequent experimental works, as well as to their publications on immunology.

From 1929 to 1954 he was Master of Trinity Hall, Cambridge (he was a Fellow there since he came to Cambridge in 1922) and from 1937 to 1939 Vice-Chancellor of the University of Cambridge. He was also Chairman of the Imperial Cancer Research Fund (1941-1956), member of the Medical Research Council (MRC), founder of the East Anglian Pathologists Club, and, from 1920 to 1954, secretary of the Pathological Society. Working for various universities he became: honorary Legum Doctor (LL.D) at University of Aberdeen and at Western Reserve University, honorary Doctor of Science (D.Sc) at University of Liverpool, and Honorary Fellow of New College, University of Oxford (from 1953). During the second world war he organized several blood transfusion donor services, while the department also accommodated the Galton Laboratory blood-grouping unit and the MRC Emergency Public Health Laboratory. After the war the Department of Pathology rose again, more closely bound to medicine.

Personal life
Henry Dean married Irene Wilson, their son Sir Patrick Henry Dean, the United Kingdom Ambassador to the United States.
Their daughter Elizabeth Mary Dean (1910- 2000) married The Ven. John Richardson (Archdeacon of Derby)

Works
List of works in MLA format taken from the results of the search engines in the websites Wiley Online Library (for the works on The Journal of Pathology and Bacteriology) and National Center for Biotechnology Information (for all the other works).

References

External links
 University of Cambridge: Department of Pathology

Masters of Trinity Hall, Cambridge
Vice-Chancellors of the University of Cambridge
1879 births
1961 deaths
People educated at Sherborne School
MacCormac family of County Armagh, Northern Ireland
Medical doctors from Bournemouth
English pathologists